Jaker Ali (born 22 February 1998) is a Bangladeshi cricketer. He made his first-class debut for Sylhet Division in the 2016–17 National Cricket League on 27 December 2016. Prior to his first-class debut, he was part of Bangladesh's squad for the 2016 Under-19 Cricket World Cup.

He made his List A debut for Prime Doleshwar Sporting Club in the 2016–17 Dhaka Premier Division Cricket League on 26 April 2017.

In October 2018, he was named in the squad for the Sylhet Sixers team, following the draft for the 2018–19 Bangladesh Premier League. He made his Twenty20 debut for the Sylhet Sixers in the 2018–19 Bangladesh Premier League on 16 January 2019. In November 2019, he was selected to play for the Dhaka Platoon in the 2019–20 Bangladesh Premier League.

References

External links
 

1998 births
Living people
Bangladeshi cricketers
Sylhet Division cricketers
Prime Doleshwar Sporting Club cricketers
Place of birth missing (living people)
Sylhet Strikers cricketers